Erhard Ahmann (21 May 1941 – 14 December 2005) was a German football manager.

In 1972, he was the assistant manager of the West Germany national football team. Later he most notably managed Arminia Bielefeld and Alemannia Aachen.

External links 
Career stats

1941 births
2005 deaths
People from Sundern
Sportspeople from Arnsberg (region)
German football managers
Arminia Bielefeld managers
Alemannia Aachen managers
Wuppertaler SV managers
German footballers
Association football defenders
Footballers from North Rhine-Westphalia